Renica is an Italian surname. Notable people with the surname include:

Alessandro Renica (born 1962), Italian footballer and manager
Giovanni Renica (1808–1884), Italian painter
Umberto Renica (1921–1975), Italian footballer

Italian-language surnames